Wolverine and the X-Men is a comic book series published by Marvel Comics. The title features Wolverine in his role as the headmaster of Jean Grey School for Higher Learning, the students of the school, and various members of the mutant superhero team, the X-Men, who serve as professors of the school.

Publication history
During the 2011 crossover X-Men: Regenesis, Wolverine left Utopia with a group of X-Men and students. They moved back to Westchester, New York, where they founded the Jean Grey School for Higher Learning.

The initial issues of Wolverine and the X-Men mainly featured the Jean Grey School and its faculty and students. The main antagonist in the book was a new Hellfire Club made up of homicidal genius children, led by Kade Kilgore. Starting from issue #9 the series became a tie-in to the Avengers vs. X-Men event until issue #18, except for issue #17 which featured a standalone story. Starting from issue #19, the series became part of the Marvel NOW! event. According to writer Jason Aaron, the book would follow the events of issue #18, in which the character Broo was shot in the head, and would return to the same type of stories that they were doing before Avengers vs. X-Men. "This is our first Marvel NOW! issue, issue #19, so if anything we're trying to get back to where we were before the 'AvX' madness. It picks up right after the events of 18. There were a lot of angry people on the Internet, which was great. It made my day.".

The first volume ended in February 2014 at issue #42. It was relaunched as a new volume 2 one week later by Jason Latour as part of the All-New Marvel NOW! event. With the death of Wolverine, the second volume ended with issue 12. It was followed by Spider-Man and the X-Men, a limited series set after Logan's death. In it, Spider-Man leads a Special Class while secretly investigating the students at Wolverine's request.

Synopsis

Volume 1
Regenesis
Wolverine leaves Cyclops' Utopia and founds the Jean Grey School of Higher Learning with Kitty Pryde, Beast, Iceman, and several other mutants as junior faculty and students. He also negotiates with Captain America to release Kid Omega to his custody as a student. On the first day the NY State Board of Education is sent to approve the school's charter, but to complicate things the new Hellfire Club attacks the school with Frankenstein monster clones and a Krakoa. The Krakoa eventually decides to join as an unofficial X-Man and the clones are subdued. Wolverine then hires attorney Matt Murdock to sue Kade Kilgore, the new black king of the Hellfire Club and CEO of Kilgore, for damages following an attack. Beast brainwashes representatives of the New York State BOE to have them grant the school an educational charter.

Angel loses his board seat on Worrthington Industries, due to a corporate coup initiated by the Hellfire Club. Wolverine then realizes he cannot financially keep the school open, so he travels to a casino planet with Quinton Quire. Kitty Pryde, who has found herself mysteriously pregnant with Brood must defend the school from a mysterious bounty hunter named Dr. Xanto Starblood. Wolverine does not make it back with the casino winnings, but it turns out Krakoa can create diamonds, so the school does not have any more financial problems.

Alpha & Omega

Avengers vs X-Men
Soon the war between the Avengers and X-Men comes to the school. Wolverine initially stays neutral, but Cyclops comes to school to secretly recruit Rachel Summers, Iceman, Gambit, and Angel. Gladiator comes to the academy to return his son and kill the Phoenix, but is brutally defeated by the combined Phoenix Force. Eventually, the Phoenix Force is defeated by Hope, but Broo is shot in the face by Kade Kilgore while investigating Oya's mysterious new friend.

Marvel Now
Angel has returned to his family's Worthington Industries and hires Murdock to prove the executives were planning to illegally obtain control. With the directors fired, Angel hires students from his A.P. economics class as his new board of directors. Angel is no longer interested in his business and decides to recruit new mutants for the school, he eventually travels to Brazil to enroll Iara Dos Santos, a.k.a. Shark-Girl after a scuffle with Mystique and Silver Samurai.

Kilgore then established the Hellfire Academy with his first recruit, the mutant Mudcrab. Kitty also is too busy to run the school now that she is watching the time-displaced All-New X-Men. She hires Storm as new headmistress. The Murder Circus comes into town and brainwashes all the adults in Salem Center. The students are able to break the spell thanks to new student Eye Boy. It turns out Frankenstein's Monster and Calcabria are searching for the last descendant of Victor Frankenstein, who is Baron Maximilian von Katzenelnbogen. After narrowly escaping and almost getting Oya killed twice, Max embraces his Frankenstein heritage. Now with some downtime, Kitty Pryde and Bobby Drake go on a date and Storm argues with her ex-husband the Black Panther during a tele-conference, then shares a passionate kiss with Wolverine.

Broo wakes up from his coma in a feral state. Wolverine decides to take Oya, Jia Jing, Broo, Quentin, Glob Herman, Shark Girl, and Eye Boy to Savage Land in order to teach them survival. Wolverine's brother, Dog Logan kidnaps Wolverine and sets a trap for the students by teleporting cowboys from the past and androids from the future. His intention was to give the students "real life" training, but the students rebel. Eventually Wolverine rejoins the group, but refuses to fight Dog. One of the cowboys shoots at Dog and Quentin stops the bullet even though Dog punched him minutes ago. Dog feels guilty and teleports out. Wolverine gathers all the students except Glob, who ran away before the battle. It turns out Wolverine expelled him on the plane ride over. Sauron recruits Glob for the Hellfire Academy.

Issue #29 flashes forward 25 years into the future. Wolverine is still headmaster of the school and opens a time capsule. He decides to change the past by sending his younger self a key to a special vault left behind by Dog Logan. Back in the present Oya decides to join the Hellfire Academy. Beast travels to S.W.O.R.D. HQ to enlist the help of Dr. Xanto Starblood in reinstating Broo's mind. Before he can help, The Philistine teleports Starblood and Broo. It turns out the Toad and Quentin have been conspiring to turn Glob and Oya.

HellFire Saga
Quentin Quire and Snot-Boy are teleported to a secret island by The Philistine and start their first day at the Hellfire Academy. Mystique teaches first period class called "Introduction to Evil". Second period is Science taught by Sauron. Third period is xenobiology by Dr. Xanto Starblood. Dog Logan teaches PE and Husk is the librarian and lunch lady. Master Pandemonium teaches evil literature and Madame Mojo teaches public relations. Wendigo is the danger room instructor and Toad, to his chagrin, is the janitor. Sabertooth is the headmaster. The goal of the school is to create the next generation of villains, so Kilgore can sell more sentinels. Quentin finds Oya and vows to try to help her find Broo's assailant and then help escape. The Philistine, who received his powers from an mystical device called the Siege Perilous (comics), can block Quentin's telepathy and read his mind. They try to torture and weaken him so he can enter The Siege and transform, like Snot-Boy. Toad has a change of heart and tries to free him from Sauron and Madame Mojo. During the break out, Husk and the new Hellions try to stop them and Kilgore asks Oya to become the new Black Queen. She agrees only if he will kill Broo. Kilgore states that will be easy, since he already shot him in the face. Wolverine uses the Bamfs to track down the Lord Death Strike, who he hopes knows the academies location, but Beast realizes that Krakoa knows where the island is located and they follow him hidden island. Kilgore has other Krakoas fight off the X-Men's Krakoa and Iceman, while Wolverine and the X-Men fight off the Academy's staff. As the Hellfire Club members begin to fight with each other, Toad begins to rip off all of Husk's layers until she regains her sanity. The Philistine then takes Wilhemina into the Siege, leaving Dog to  rescue Kade and the Bamfs rescuing the remaining students, Manuel Enduque and Baron Maximilian, before the school is destroyed. The conclusion of the arc shows Manuel and Max become new students at the Jean grey School, Oya and Quentin are now dating, Broo is finally cured of his feral state by a mysterious blue-skinned apparition, and Kade trapped within the Siege Perilous.

Battle of the Atom
The Jean Grey School is the center of the 10 issue crossover Battle of the Atom event.

Graduation
After the battle of the Atom, Maria Hill visits the school with a flotilla. Wolverine does not respond well to her show of force. He has Quinton hack into S.H.I.E.L.D. database about a sentinel base. The Cuckoo Sisters also notice the hack and Cyclops investigates. Two new students, Joseph and Josephine Bricklemoore join the school, but it turns out that they are double agents working for S.H.I.E.L.D.'s mutant liaison, Dazzler, who is actually Mystique. Joseph grows fond of the students and school, but Josephine does not want to fail S.H.I.E.L.D. because they might get sent back to the orphanage where they grew up. The other students figure out they are agents and are taking Mutant Growth Hormone. Josephine wants to fight her way out, but she is stunned by Joseph, who asks Quentin to mind wipe them both. Wolverine and Cyclops defeat the sentinels base and have a heart-to-heart.

Toad gets fired as the school janitor for helping the Hellfire Club. He then helps Baron Maximilian escape the school, but beats up Manuel. Manuel repeats a final message from Toad to Paige Guthrie, the new guidance counselor, who does not remember falling in love with Toad.

Issue 42 begins with graduation ceremony. Quentin is upset he has not become the villain he always thought he will be. The issue incorporates flashforwards to an adult Idie and geriatric Logan. Logan has decided it is time to close the school.

The 2014 Annual takes place during the Infinity Crossover event. It takes place at the Shi'ar School for Superguardians where Kubark is sent back to finish his training after being removed from the Jean Grey School. He is ostracized by other students for being different (he is the last Strontian and only member of his class, since classes are based on race). As the Builders attack the Shi'ar home planet all the sub-guardians, or students, are sent to battle, except Gladiator orders four Warbirds to guard Kubark back on the planet. Kubark breaks free from his wardens and joins the fray. He earns the respect of his fellow students after destroying a Builder battle ship and even steals a kiss from a female Smasher. His father relates to his solitude and allows him to return to the Jean Grey School.

Volume 2
Tomorrow Never Learns 
Edan Younge, CEO of the mysterious Phoenix Corporation, tries to recruit Quentin Quire and sends Faithful John to the school to kill Evan in order to prevent him from becoming Apocalypse. The team travels to the future with Fantomex to find out Quentin becomes the new Phoenix Force. With the help of Cyclops and new student Nature Girl, Faithful John is defeated, Evan is saved, and Edan Younge is killed. However, Quentin becomes the new CEO of Phoenix and abandons the school.

Death of Wolverine
Melita Gardner begins writing a biography on Wolverine's life and interviews the students. In a last ditch effort to turn him from an evil path, Wolverine infiltrates a Hellfire Club party and confronts Quentin with Magneto's helmet for psychic protection, but fails. Storm returns later and destroys the party pretending to be under Quentin's control, thus putting him on probation with the Hellfire Club and undermining his plans.

Jean Grey School for Higher Learning

Contributors
Regular writers
Jason Aaron (2011–14)
Jason Latour (2014)

Regular artists
Chris Bachalo (2011–12)
Nick Bradshaw (2011–14)
Mahmud Asrar (2014)

Collected editions

Volume 1 (2011 series)

Volume 2 (2014 series)

References

External links

Superhero comics
X-Men titles
2011 comics debuts
Comics by Jason Aaron